The 2018 Haarlem Baseball Week was an international baseball competition held at the Pim Mulier Stadium in Haarlem, the Netherlands from 13–22 July 2018. It was the 29th edition of the tournament.

Japan became champions for the fourth time, beating Chinese Taipei in the final who played their first final in the history of the tournament.

Teams
A usual number of six teams were invited to the tournament.

 
 Chinese Taipei is the official IBAF designation for the team representing the state officially referred to as the Republic of China, more commonly known as Taiwan. (See also political status of Taiwan for details.)
 As national team. 6 non-national teams from West Germany have appeared before.

Group stage

Standings

Game results

Play-offs

Final

Final standings

External links
Official Website

References

Haarlem Baseball Week